The 1934 Basingstoke by-election was a parliamentary by-election for the British House of Commons constituency of Basingstoke on 19 April 1934.

Vacancy
The by-election was caused by the resignation of the sitting Conservative MP, Gerard Wallop. He resigned suddenly on 14 February 1934. He had been MP here since holding the seat in 1929.

Election history
Basingstoke had been won by the Conservatives at every election since 1885 apart from 1923 when the Liberals won. The result at the last General election was as follows;

Candidates
The local Conservatives selected 34-year-old Henry Drummond-Wolff as candidate to defend the seat. He was the grandson of former Conservative MP, Sir Henry Drummond-Wolff. He had contested the 1933 Rotherham by-election without success.
The Liberal candidate from the last election, Frances Josephy had been selected as prospective candidate for Devizes, so the Liberals had to look for a new candidate. On 27 February they selected 25-year-old John Foot as candidate. He was a son of the Liberal MP Isaac Foot and a younger brother of the Liberal MP Dingle Foot. He was educated at Forres School, Swanage and then Bembridge School on the Isle of Wight. He went on to read jurisprudence at Balliol College, Oxford, where he was President of the Oxford Union in 1931, following in the steps of his elder brother Dingle (1928). After graduation he joined the family law firm. He was standing for parliament for the first time.
The local Labour party selected year-old James William Barker as candidate.

Campaign
Polling Day was set for 19 April 1934, some two months after the vacancy first became known. Nominations closed on 9 April 1934.

Foreign Affairs dominated the campaign, particularly the Conservative dominated National Government's isolationist approach.

The Conservative campaign leaned heavily on the support of their National Government partners. On 5 April, leading Liberal National MP, Ernest Brown, the Minister for Mines, spoke in support of Drummond Wolff. Liberal National Leader Sir John Simon, the Foreign Secretary sent a public letter of support to the Conservative candidate which called on Liberals to vote Conservative.

On the Eve of poll, the Liberal Party Leader, Sir Herbert Samuel visited the constituency and spoke at a public meeting in support of Foot.

Result
Despite a large swing against the National Government, the Conservative managed to hold onto the seat.

Aftermath
A Peace Ballot was launched in 1934 to ascertain public support for the League of Nations and collective security. As a result, just before the 1935 general election, the National Government agreed to the Liberal policy of working through the League of Nations. Drummond-Wolff chose not to defend his seat at the following General Election. Foot stood here again. The result at the following General election;

See also
 Lists of United Kingdom by-elections
 United Kingdom by-election records

References

 

1934 elections in the United Kingdom
1934 in England
By-elections to the Parliament of the United Kingdom in Hampshire constituencies
Basingstoke
20th century in Hampshire